Joseph Victor von Scheffel (16 February 1826 – 9 April 1886) was a German poet and novelist.

Biography
He was born at Karlsruhe. His father, a retired major in the Baden army, was a civil engineer and member of the commission for regulating the course of the Rhine; his mother, née Josephine Krederer, the daughter of a prosperous tradesman at Oberndorf am Neckar, was a woman of great intellectual powers and of a romantic disposition. Young Scheffel was educated at the lyceum at Karlsruhe and afterwards (1843–1847) at the universities of Munich, Heidelberg and Berlin.

After passing the state examination for admission to the judicial service, he graduated Doctor juris and for four years (1848–1852) held an official position at the town of Säckingen. Here he wrote his poem Der Trompeter von Säckingen (The trumpeter of Saeckingen) (1853), a romantic and humorous tale which immediately gained extraordinary popularity. It has reached more than 250 editions and was made into an opera by Viktor Nessler in 1884. Scheffel next undertook a journey to Italy.

Returning home in 1853 he found his parents more than ever anxious that he should continue his legal career. But in 1854, defective eyesight incapacitated him; he quit the government service and took up his residence at Heidelberg, with the intention of preparing himself for a post on the teaching staff of the university. His studies were, however, interrupted by eye disease, and in search of health he proceeded to Switzerland and took up his abode on the Lake of Constance, and elaborated the plan of his famous historical romance Ekkehard (1857); (Eng. trans. by Sofie Delffs, Leipzig, 1872). Part of this work was later used by Max Bruch as the libretto for his cantata The Lay of the Norsemen.

The first ideas for this work he got from the Monumenta Germaniae Historica. It was hardly less popular than the Trompeter von Säckingen. In 1901 it reached the 179th edition. Scheffel next returned to Heidelberg, and published Gaudeamus, Lieder aus dem Engeren und Weiteren (1868), a collection of joyous and humorous songs, the subject- matter of which is taken partly from German legends and partly from historical subjects. In these songs the author shows himself the light-hearted student, a friend of wine and song; and their success is unexampled in German literature and encouraged numerous imitators. One example is Im schwarzen Walfisch zu Askalon, the lyrics reflect an endorsement of the bacchanalian mayhem of student life. The song describes an 'old assyrian' drinking binge with some references to the Classics. The large invoice is being provided in cuneiform on six brick stones. However the carouser has to admit that he left his money already in Nineves' Lamb inn and gets kicked out. In typical manner of Scheffel, it contains an anachronistic mixture of various times and eras, parodistic notions on current science, as e.g. Historical criticism. There are various additional verses, including political parody and verses mocking different sorts of fraternities or even one just and only one for mathematics. The song has been used as name for traditional students inns, e.g. in Heidelberg.
Scheffel however had some melancholic notions as well, as for the unsuccessful German revolution of 1848 and his personal disappointment in vowing for the love of his live, Emma Heim, 1851 had him disappointed as well. He also used natural science to mock the political environment, as he mocked Hegel with his Guano poem or referred to the course of time in his Ichthyosaurus poem. Indirectly, Scheffel coined the expression Biedermeier for the pre 1848 age, as two of Scheffel poems Biedermanns Abendgemütlichkeit and Bummelmaiers Klage, based on the poetry of teacher and poet Samuel Friedrich Sauter, published 1848, were used in later satires about the reactionary petty bourgeois.

For two years (1857–1859) Scheffel was custodian of the library of Prince Egon von Fürstenberg at Donaueschingen, but giving up his appointment in 1850, visited Joseph von Laßberg, at Meersburg on the Lake of Constance, stayed for a while with the grand duke Charles Alexander of Saxe-Weimar at the Wartburg in Thuringia, then, settling at Karlsruhe, he married in 1864 Caroline von Malzen, and, in 1872, retired to his Villa Seehalde near Radolfzell on the lower Lake of Constance. On the occasion of his jubilee (1876), which was celebrated all over Germany, he was granted a patent of hereditary nobility by the grand duke of Baden. He died at Karlsruhe on 9 April 1886.

Legacy 

1891 Joseph Stöckle (1844–1893) founded the Scheffelbund in Schwetzingen (now Karlsruhe), the largest literary society in Germany with about 7.000 members. The Scheffelprize is dedicated to excellent pupils. There are various Scheffel memorials, street and place names. The Scheffel Archive is partially at the Scheffelbund and partially in Badischen Landesbibliothek.

Works
His works, other than those already mentioned, are:
Frau Aventiure. Lieder aus Heinrich von Ofterdingens Zeit (1863)
Juniperus. Geschichte eines Kreuzfahrers (1866)
Bergpsalmen (1870)
Waldeinsamkeit (1880)
Der Heini von Steier (1883)
Hugideo, eine alte Geschichte (1884)
Volumes of Reisebilder (1887); Epistein (1892); and Briefe (1898) were published posthumously. Scheffel's Gesammelte Werke have been published in six volumes (1907).

Editions in English
 Ekkehard. A tale of the tenth century. Translated from the German by Sofie Delffs. In: German Authors. Collection of German Authors. (Tauchnitz edition.) vol. 21–22. 1867.
 Charles Godfrey Leland, Gaudeamus! Humorous Poems by Joseph Viktor von Scheffel, Ebook-Nr. 35848 on gutenberg.org

Notes

References
  This article in turn cites:
 A. Ruhemann: Joseph Victor von Scheffel (1887)
 G. Zernin: Erinnerungen an Joseph Victor von Scheffel (1887)
 J. Proelß: Scheffels Leben und Dichten (1887)
 L. von Kobell: Scheffel und seine Frau (1901)
 E. Boerschel: J. V. von Scheffel und Emma Heim (1906).

Further reading
 Anton Breitner (Ed.): Scheffel-Gedenkbuch. Aus Anlaß der Gründung des Scheffel-Bundes in Österreich. Wien, Pest & Leipzig: A. Hartleben's Verlag 1890.
 Manfred Fuhrmann: Scheffels Erzählwerk: Bildungsbeflissenheit, Deutschtümelei, 1981. In: derselbe: Europas fremd gewordene Fundamente. Aktuelles zu Themen aus der Antike. Zürich: Artemis u. Winkler 1995. 
 Reiner Haehling von Lanzenauer: Dichterjurist Scheffel. Karlsruhe: Verl. d. Ges. für Kulturhistor. Dokumentation e. V. 1988. (= Schriftenreihe des Rechtshistorischen Museums Karlsruhe; 6) 
 Günther Mahal: Joseph Viktor von Scheffel. Versuch einer Revision. Karlsruhe: Müller 1986. 
 Joseph Victor von Scheffel (1826–1886). Ein deutscher Poet – gefeiert und geschmäht, hrsg. v. Walter Berschin. Ostfildern: Thorbecke 2003. 
 Joseph Victor von Scheffel. Bibliographie 1945 bis 2001, zusammengestellt v. Stefan Schank. Karlsruhe: Scheffelbund 2001.
 Rolf Selbmann: Dichterberuf im bürgerlichen Zeitalter. Joseph Viktor von Scheffel und seine Literatur. Heidelberg: Winter 1982. (= Beiträge zur neueren Literaturgeschichte; F. 3, 58) 
 Ludwig Wolf: Der Anteil der Natur am Menschenleben bei Freytag und Scheffel. Amsterdam: Swets u. Zeitlinger 1968. (= Gießener Beiträge zur Deutschen Philologie; 9)
 Werner Wunderlich: "Medieval Images: Joseph Viktor von Scheffel's Novel Ekkehard and St. Gall." In: Medievalism in the Modern World. Essays in Honour of Leslie J. Workman, ed. Richard Utz and Tom Shippey (Turnhout: Brepols, 1998), pp. 193–225.

External links

Works by Joseph Viktor von Scheffel at zeno.org
 
 
 
 

1826 births
1886 deaths
Writers from Karlsruhe
Members of the Frankfurt Parliament
People from the Grand Duchy of Baden
19th-century German poets
German untitled nobility
Heidelberg University alumni
Ludwig Maximilian University of Munich alumni
Humboldt University of Berlin alumni
Biedermeier writers
German male poets
19th-century German writers
19th-century German male writers